The Isthmian League is a regional men's football league covering Greater London, East and South East England, featuring mostly semi-professional clubs.

Founded in 1905 by amateur clubs in the London area, the league now consists of 82 teams in four divisions: the Premier Division above its three feeder divisions, the North, South Central and South East divisions.

Together with the Southern League and the Northern Premier League, it forms the seventh and eighth levels of the English football league system. It has various regional feeder leagues and the league as a whole is a feeder league mainly to the National League South.

History
Before the Isthmian League was formed, there were no leagues in which amateur football clubs could compete, only knock-out cup competitions. Therefore, a meeting took place between representatives of Casuals, Civil Service, Clapton, Ealing Association, Ilford and London Caledonians to discuss the creation of a strong amateur league. All the clubs supported the idea and the Isthmian League was born on 7 March 1905. Membership to the league was through invitation only. The league was very strongly dedicated to the cause of amateurism in sport; consequently, the champions of the league did not even receive a trophy or medals; the league's Latin motto was honor sufficit ('honour is sufficient').

Thus, those clubs less able to compete financially gravitated to it rather than to the Southern League, which attracted clubs with ambition and money. Although the Isthmian League established itself as one of the strongest amateur leagues in the country, routinely providing the winners of the FA Amateur Cup, it was still regarded as being at a lower level than the Southern League, which had developed into the top regional semi-professional league. By 1922 the Isthmian League had fourteen clubs and over the next five decades, only a few new members were admitted, mainly to fill vacancies left by clubs leaving the league. Most new Isthmian League members joined from the Athenian League, which was similarly dedicated to amateurism.

The Isthmian League was most likely named after the ancient Isthmian Games, with the later Athenian League, Corinthian League, Delphian League, Spartan League, Parthenon League and Aetolian League all adding a Classical Greek flavour to amateur football competition. In 1962 an 'all-star' team from the Isthmian League entered the 1962 Ugandan Independence Tournament, drawing both their games versus Kenya and Ghana.

The league finally began to permit professionalism in the mid 1970s when the Football Association abolished the long-standing distinction between amateur and professional status with effect from the 1974–75 season. A second division of sixteen clubs was formed in 1973 and a third division followed in 1977. However, the league still remained officious and refused to participate in the formation of the Alliance Premier League in 1979 and whilst two Isthmian clubs, Enfield and Dagenham, defected to the APL in 1981, it was not until 1985 that the Isthmian League champions were given a promotion place to the newly renamed Football Conference. The reward of promotion into the Conference means that, since 1985, no team has won the league champions title two seasons in succession (as had happened on 22 occasions previously). The Athenian League disbanded in 1984 when the Isthmian League Second Division split into North and South Divisions. These were restructured yet again to Second and Third Divisions in 1991.

In 2002, the league was restructured once more, with the First and Second Divisions merging to become Division One North and Division One South (later renamed simply the North and South divisions), and the Third Division being renamed as Division Two. In addition, the league's three feeder leagues—the Combined Counties League, Essex Senior League and Spartan South Midlands League—ran in parallel with Division Two, and were able to feed directly into the regional Division Ones.

In 2004, The Football Association pushed through a major restructuring of the entire national non-league National League System, creating new regional divisions of the Football Conference feeding into the top, national, level. As a consequence of this restructuring, the Isthmian League was reduced back down to three divisions, and its boundaries were changed to remove the overlap with the Southern League.

In 2006, further reorganisation saw a reversion to two regional Division Ones and the disbandment of Division Two. This current plan calls for clubs based on the edges of the Isthmian League's territory to transfer to and from the Southern League as necessary to maintain numerical balance between the leagues. One team, Clapton, who were ever present in the Isthmian League since its foundation, were moved to the Essex Senior League for the 2006–07 season. Dulwich Hamlet, who had joined the league in 1907, became its longest serving member until their promotion to the National League South for the 2018–19 season.

In May 2017, The Football Association chose the Isthmian League to add a third regional division at Step 4 as part of further restructuring in the National League System, reducing all divisions at Step 4 to 20 teams. The new division started play in the 2018–19 season.

Current Isthmian League members

Premier Division
 Aveley
 Billericay Town
 Bishop's Stortford
 Bognor Regis Town
 Bowers & Pitsea
 Brightlingsea Regent
 Canvey Island
 Carshalton Athletic
 Corinthian-Casuals
 Cray Wanderers
 Enfield Town
 Folkestone Invicta
 Haringey Borough
 Hastings United
 Herne Bay
 Hornchurch
 Horsham
 Kingstonian
 Lewes
 Margate
 Potters Bar Town
 Wingate & Finchley

North Division
 AFC Sudbury
 Basildon United
 Brentwood Town
 Bury Town
 Coggeshall Town
 East Thurrock United
 Felixstowe & Walton United
 Gorleston
 Grays Athletic
 Great Wakering Rovers
 Hashtag United
 Heybridge Swifts
 Hullbridge Sports
 Lowestoft Town
 Maldon & Tiptree
 New Salamis
 Stowmarket Town
 Tilbury
 Witham Town
 Wroxham

South Central Division
 Ashford Town (Middx)
 Basingstoke Town
 Bedfont Sports
 Binfield
 Chertsey Town
 Chipstead
 Guernsey
 Hanworth Villa
 Leatherhead
 Marlow
 Merstham
 Northwood
 South Park
 Southall
 Sutton Common Rovers
 Thatcham Town
 Tooting & Mitcham United
 Uxbridge
 Walton & Hersham
 Westfield

South East Division
 Ashford United
 Beckenham Town
 Burgess Hill Town
 Chatham Town
 Chichester City
 Corinthian
 Cray Valley Paper Mills
 East Grinstead Town
 Faversham Town
 Haywards Heath Town
 Hythe Town
 Lancing
 Littlehampton Town
 Ramsgate
 Sevenoaks Town
 Sheppey United
 Sittingbourne
 Three Bridges
 VCD Athletic
 Whitehawk

Champions

For the 1973–74 season, Division Two was added.

For the 1977–78 season, Division One was renamed the Premier Division, Division Two was renamed Division One and new Division Two was added.

For the 1984–85 season, Division Two was reorganised into North and South regions.

For the 1991–92 season, regional divisions Two were merged and Division Three was added.

At the end of the 1994–95 season, Enfield were denied promotion to the Conference. Their place was taken by Slough Town who finished as runners-up.

For the 2002–03 season, Division One was reorganised into North and South regions and Division Three was disbanded.

For the 2004–05 season Division Ones North and South were merged.

For the 2006–07 season, Division One was reorganised into North and South regions and Division Two was disbanded.

For the 2018–19 season, the South Division was reorganised into South Central and South East divisions.

Promoted
Since the league's formation in 1905, the following clubs have won promotion to higher levels of the English football league system -

Asterisk indicates club was promoted via play-offs

Sponsorship
The Isthmian League was the first league to have sponsorship, having been selected by Rothmans, who sponsored the league from 1973 to 1977. The company offered prize money for position in the league but money was deducted for bookings. Thus the money encouraged both more goals and fair play. The sponsors after Rothmans to the present day have been: Michael Lawrie (1977–78), Berger (1978–82), Servowarm (1982–85), Vauxhall-Opel (1985–90), Vauxhall (1990–91), Diadora (1991–95), ICIS (1995–97), Ryman (1997–2017), Bostik (2017–19) and BetVictor (2019–20). Entain's Pitching In was announced as the next sponsor for 2020–21. At the time of announcement, Entain went by its former name GVC Holdings. Under this partnership, Isthmian is marketed as one of the three Trident Leagues, alongside the Northern Premier and Southern leagues.

Ryman also sponsored the Isthmian Youth League and Isthmian Development League upon their creations in 2007 and 2013 respectively. Ryman chairman Theo Paphitis added to his league sponsorship through his flagship companies. Robert Dyas became sponsors of the Isthmian League Cup, Isthmian Veterans Cup, Isthmian Disability Cup and Isthmian Youth Play-off Cup in 2014, and Boux Avenue sponsored the Isthmian Women's Cup from 2014 to 2017.

Becoming the longest running sports sponsorship in UK football, Ryman stepped down as sponsors at the end of the 2016–17 season after 20 years.

League Cup
The Alan Turvey Trophy, formerly the Isthmian League Cup, has run since 1975 and involves all Isthmian League teams.

Former members 
Several previous members of the Isthmian League have reached the English Football League. In its earlier years, the Football League didn't directly promote teams from the Non-League system on merit; instead, holding regular elections, for which any Non-League side could apply to enter. In practice, only the most ambitious non-League sides put themselves forward for election, and success was uncommon (outside of divisional expansions, from 1945 to its abolition in 1987, only seven clubs were successful in vying for admission to the League).  No Isthmian League member ever put themselves forward for election to the Football League, but Wimbledon were elected as a Southern League member, having left the Isthmian League in 1964.

The first ex-Isthmian League team to reach the Football League was Wimbledon in 1977, followed subsequently by Maidstone United (1989), Wycombe Wanderers (1993), Yeovil Town (2003), Dagenham & Redbridge (2007), Aldershot Town (2008), Stevenage (2010), and AFC Wimbledon (2011). Sutton United, who had been in the Isthmian League as recently as 2011, became the most recent former member to be promoted to the Football League, winning promotion in 2021.

See also
 Northern Premier League
 Southern Football League

Footnotes

References

External links
 Official website

 
1905 establishments in England
7
Sports leagues established in 1905
Eng